Mauricio Barcelata Pinedo (born 5 January 1970 in Alvarado, Veracruz) is a Mexican actor and TV host. He currently hosts Sale el Sol, the morning show of Imagen Televisión.

Biography
Barcelata started his professional career as member of a child pop band called "Cometa". He later appeared as an extra in the telenovela Agujetas de color de rosa (1994). In the early 2000s he hosted the afternoon show Vida TV.

After several feuds with Televisa's directives in January 2009 Barcelata left the network and moved to TV Azteca where he hosted Para todos and Venga la Alegría.

In 2016, he moved to upstart Imagen Televisión and became the host of its morning program, Sale el Sol.

Career

As actor
 Plaza Sésamo
 Agujetas de color de rosa (1994)
 Mi querida Isabel (1996)
 Mujer, casos de la vida real (1996-2003)
 Mi generación (1997-1998)
 ¿Qué nos pasa? (1998)
 Soñadoras (1998)
 Cuentos para solitarios (1999)
 DKDA: Sueños de juventud (1999-2000)
 Primer amor... a mil por hora
 El juego de la vida
 Desde Gayola (2002)
 Mujer de Madera
 La fea más bella
 Muchachitas como tú
 Vecinos (2008)
 Mujeres asesinas (2008)
 La loba (2010)
 Quererte Así (2012)

As host
 Vida TV
 Espacio en Blanco (2006) 
 Nocturninos (2008 - 2009)
 Muévete
 Para todos
 Justo a tiempo (2010)
 Venga la alegría (2012)
 N2Ruedas (2013)
 Sale el Sol (2016-2019)

References

1970 births
Living people
Male actors from Veracruz
Mexican male telenovela actors
Mexican male television actors
Mexican television presenters
20th-century Mexican male actors
21st-century Mexican male actors
People from Alvarado, Veracruz